Lasha Gulelauri (Georgian: ლაშა თორღვაიძე; born 26 May 1993) is a Georgian athlete specialising in the triple jump. He represented his country at the 2016 Summer Olympics without having a recording mark in the qualification round.

His personal bests in the event are 16.87 metres outdoors (+0.9 m/s, Almaty 2016) and 16.62 metres indoors (Tbilisi 2016).

International competitions

References

1993 births
Living people
Male triple jumpers from Georgia (country)
Athletes (track and field) at the 2015 European Games
Athletes (track and field) at the 2016 Summer Olympics
Athletes (track and field) at the 2020 Summer Olympics
Olympic athletes of Georgia (country)
Olympic male triple jumpers
European Games competitors for Georgia (country)
21st-century people from Georgia (country)